KAT is an Athens metro station in Kifissia, Athens, Greece, next to the Traumatic Recovery Center (KAT), from which it derives its name. The station is situated 24.631 km from the starting point in Piraeus. The station was opened on 27 March 1989 and was renovated in 2004. It contains two platforms.

References

Athens Metro stations
Railway stations opened in 1989
1989 establishments in Greece